Samuel Cunliffe Lister, 2nd Baron Masham (1857-24 January 1917) was an English baron and industrialist.

He was born in 1857, the son of Samuel Lister, 1st Baron Masham, and was educated at Harrow and St John's College, Oxford. Like his father, who he succeeded to the peerage in 1906, he was a prominent Yorkshire industrialist.

He never married, and on his death, his title was inherited by his younger brother, John Cunliffe Lister, 3rd Baron Masham.

References

Obituary: p. 156, The Annual Register: a review of public events at home and abroad, for the year 1917. London: Longmans, Green and Co. 1918.

1857 births
1917 deaths
Businesspeople from Yorkshire
Barons in the Peerage of the United Kingdom
People educated at Harrow School
19th-century English businesspeople